A chancre is a painless genital ulcer most commonly formed during the primary stage of syphilis. This infectious lesion forms approximately 21 days after the initial exposure to Treponema pallidum, the gram-negative spirochaete bacterium yielding syphilis. Chancres transmit the sexually transmissible disease of syphilis through direct physical contact. These ulcers usually form on or around the anus, mouth, penis and vagina. Chancres may diminish between four and eight weeks without the application of medication.

Chancres are also associated with the African trypanosomiasis (sleeping sickness), surrounding the area of the tsetse fly bite.

Similarities with chancroid 

Similarities between the conditions chancre and chancroid:
 Both originate as pustules at the site of inoculation, and progress to ulcerated lesions
 Both lesions are typically 1–2 cm in diameter
 Both lesions are caused by sexually transmissible organisms
 Both lesions typically appear on the genitals of infected individuals

Differences from chancroid 
Differences between the conditions chancre and chancroid:
 Chancre is a lesion typical of infection with the bacterium that causes syphilis, Treponema pallidum
 Chancroid is a lesion typical of infection with the bacterium Haemophilus ducreyi
 Chancres are typically painless, whereas chancroid are typically painful
 Chancres are typically single, whereas chancroid are typically multiple
 Chancres cause regional bilateral lymph node enlargement, whereas chancroid cause regional unilateral lymph node enlargement
 Chancres typically exude serum, whereas chancroid typically have a grey or yellow purulent exudate
 Chancres have a hard (indurated) base with sloping edges, whereas chancroid have a soft base with undermined edges
 Chancres heal spontaneously within three to six weeks, even in the absence of treatment
 Chancres can occur in the pharynx as well as on the genitals. Not to be confused with condylomata lata, which is seen in secondary syphilis

Etymology 
The word "chancre" means "little ulcer" in Old French. Related to the English "canker", they both come from the Latin cancer, meaning "crab", which is a translation from the Greek word καρκίνος (karkínos), also meaning "crab".

See also 
 Primary cutaneous histoplasmosis

References 

Bacterium-related cutaneous conditions
Medical signs
Syphilis